Common names: Tortuga Island diamond rattlesnake,Klauber LM. 1956. Rattlesnakes: Their Habitats, Life Histories, and Influence on Mankind. Second Edition, 1997. [First published in 1956, 1972.] University of California Press, Berkeley. . Tortuga Island rattlesnake.

Crotalus atrox tortugensis is a venomous pit viper subspecies found only on Tortuga Island in the Gulf of California.

Description
Compared to C. atrox atrox, the head is shorter relative to the length of the body—a trait considered to be an indication of dwarfing, which is common in island populations.

The color pattern consists of a gray to gray-brown ground color, occasionally with a slight purplish or pinkish hue, overlaid dorsally with a series of 32-41 dark brown to purplish-brown blotches running down the length of the body. The blotches are hexagonal or diamond-shaped, marked with black spots, and bordered with irregular black mottling.

Geographic range
Found only on Tortuga Island, Baja California Sur, in the Gulf of California, Mexico. Its type locality is "Tortuga Island".

Habitat
It lives in barren, rocky, desert terrain, sparsely covered with brush and cacti.

Conservation status
This subspecies is classified as "Least Concern" on the IUCN Red List of Threatened Species. The population trend was stable when assessed in 2007. Species are listed as "Least Concern" due to their wide distribution, presumed large population, or because they are unlikely to be declining fast enough to qualify for listing in a more threatened category.

However, this species is threatened due to its limited range, though it is common on the island.

Behavior
Although Van Denburgh reported they would rattle vigorously when approached, they have been described as being less excitable than C. atrox atrox, their mainland relative.

Feeding
Its diet apparently consists of mice. Several specimens from the island are reported to have contained mammal hair, and a white-footed mouse, Peromyscus dickeyi, is common on the island.

Venom
Klauber (1956) gives an average venom yield of 56 mg for this species. For comparison, the same study yielded an average of 277 mg for C. atrox atrox.

Taxonomy
Though most recent authors consider this taxon to be distinct, it may actually be conspecific with C. atrox.

References

Further reading
 Van Denburgh, J. and J.R. Slevin. 1921. Preliminary diagnoses of more new Species of Reptiles from Islands in the Gulf of California, Mexico. Proc. California Acad. Sci., Fourth Series, Volume 11, pp. 395–398.

External links
 
 Crotalus tortugensis, incl. brief info and picture, at San Diego Natural History Museum. Accessed 23 April 2007.

atrox tortugensis
Endemic reptiles of Mexico
Endemic fauna of the Baja California Peninsula
Fauna of Gulf of California islands
Reptiles described in 1921
Taxa named by Joseph Richard Slevin